Nimek (also Romanized as Nīmek; also known as Nīmūnek) is a village in Horjand Rural District, Kuhsaran District, Ravar County, Kerman Province, Iran. At the 2006 census, its population was 82, in 23 families.

References 

Populated places in Ravar County